Jauffret is a French surname. Notable people with the surname include:

 Louis-François Jauffret (1770–1840), French educator and fabulist.
 François Jauffret (born 1942), French tennis player
 Régis Jauffret (born 1955), French writer

French-language surnames